Bloemfontein central railway station is a railway station located in Bloemfontein, Free State Province, South Africa.

The first railway line connected Bloemfontein to Cape Town in 1890, resulting in a centrally located station site on the corner of Maitland and Harvey streets, east of Kings Park. Centrally located in both the city and the nation, in March 1900 at the Battle of Paardeberg during the Second Boer War, the station became a major point of strategic fighting between the Boers and the British Army, led by General Roberts.

The modern station is served by Shosholoza Meyl inter-city trains connecting it to Johannesburg, Port Elizabeth and East London six times a week; Kimberley twice weekly; and Durban and Cape Town once weekly.

The industrial area, Hamilton, is situated to the south of the city and generates most of the stations freight traffic. During 2005-2006 over 90,000 tons of beer was received, dispatched from Rosslyn, Gauteng; 56,998 tons of fuel from East London, and 8,872 tons from Durban; and 5,000 tonnes of coal.

References

Railway
Transport in the Free State (province)
Shosholoza Meyl stations